Tenth grade or grade 10 (called Year Eleven in England and Wales, and sophomore year in the US) is the tenth year of school post-kindergarten or the tenth year after the first introductory year upon entering compulsory schooling.  In many parts of the world, the students are usually 15 or 16 years of age, depending on when their birthday occurs. The variants of 10th grade in various countries are described below.

Australia
For most Australian states, Year 10 is the fourth year of a student's high school education. However, in the Northern Territory, it is the first year of senior school, which occurs after high school. While in contrast, in most South Australian public schools, it is the third year of high school. For more in depth information on Australia's education system, see: Education in Australia.

Belgium
In Belgium, the 10th grade is called 4e secondaire in French (Walloon), or 4de middelbaar in Dutch (Flemish).

Brazil 
In Brazil, the tenth grade is the "primeiro ano do ensino médio", meaning "first grade of high school". Students tend to be 15–16 years old.

Canada
In Canada, grade 10 is the 10th year of mandatory schooling. Depending on province, it may be the first (grades 10-12 high school), second (grades 9-12 high school), third (grades 8-12 high school), or fourth year of high school (grades 7-11 high school). In most Canadian high schools, students tend to be 15 – 16 years old.

Denmark

In Denmark the 10th grade may refer to an extra year of primary school. Earlier, 10th grade was mostly for people who had a hard time in primary school and needed an extra year to prepare for high school (or another secondary education of some sort), but nowadays, it is widely popular amongst challenged and gifted students alike and usual attended at a special kind of boarding school called an "Efterskole". 10th can also be attended at a regular school, though. This year is usually taken as a way to get a break from the school system and relax and try something different before moving on to high school. 
But, more commonly, people attend the "gymnasium" (can be compared to high school) where you go from 10th-12th grade (as such, some people attend 10th grade twice). People don't usually call the steps of the Danish gymnasium for 10th, 11th or 12th grade, but usually refer to them as 1st G, 2nd G, and 3rd G. Here, G is simply the letter "G", and it refers to the three different steps of the education.

Finland
In Finland tenth grade is usually known as the first year of high School ("Lukio" in Finnish and "Gymnasiet" in Swedish). The tenth grade may also refer to an extra year of primary school ("kymppiluokka" in Finnish which literally translates to "tenth grade"). This extra year of primary school is for those without a post-primary school study position or who need some more time to decide on their future.

France
The tenth year of schooling in France is known as the Seconde, so called because it is the second last in secondary education.
It is the first year of High School ("Lycée").

Greece
In Greece, the tenth (10th) grade is called first year of lykeion school or high school or upper secondary school (Proti Lykeiou – Πρώτη Λυκείου), and it is not compulsory to attend.

Hong Kong
In Hong Kong, 10th grade is called form 4.

India
The tenth grade (the tenth school year after ninth grade) is important in India. After the completion of the tenth grade, the student is required to sit for national board exams or state board exams conducted by CBSE, CISCE, International Boards or State Boards, wherein question papers are prepared and answer sheets are checked by a central or state institution to which the school is affiliated. Also the tenth grade is called as "Class 10" and it is also known as SSLC, SSC, HSLC and Matriculation in different regions and states of India. The Grade gains even more importance as in many parts of India for selecting the desired stream in Class XI as every year students get 90-95% above very commonly.

Students are required to choose between five and seven subjects including compulsory studying of 2 languages (one of them usually English, and the other can be an Indian regional language or a foreign language), math, science (physics, chemistry, biology and environmental science), social science (history, geography, political science and economics). Most of the students opt for Information Technology (vocational) or Computer Applications (academic) or even a third language as their sixth subject.

Indonesia
In Indonesia grade ten is called class X and forms the first year in senior high school. Students aged 15 to 16 attend class X.

Ireland
In Ireland, it is the 4th year of Secondary School or Transition Year or Idirbhliain in Gaelscoileanna. In most secondary schools optional subjects are introduced. Students continue normal classes but also have the opportunity to try new things such as work experience, participation in school stage productions or do other activities or courses such as ECDL or different sports. Students do not sit tests within this year.

Israel
In Israel, the tenth grade is the first year of high school (pronounced in Hebrew as Tichon) in most formal places, which lasts three years. In some cities (such as Ramat Gan, Givatayim, and Modi'in-Maccabim-Re'ut), elementary school ends at 9th grade and high school starts at 10th grade.

In Israel, 10th-grade (Sophomore year) students have to choose between classes (Megamot) that are split into 2 groups, and the split differs between schools. (classes such as biology, chemistry, acting, engineering, and more...)
and those students 
can choose if they want to take 1 class (Melea) or 2 classes (Murchevet), but they have to take 1 class at least (apart from Maths, English, Hebrew, History, literature, Torah, and Citizenship).

These classes all add points to their final report card, or the "bagrut" they get in 12th grade,
and students need to get at least 21 points from all classes including;

Math: 3-5 points

English: 3-5 points

Hebrew: 2 points

History: 2 points

literature: 2 points

Hebrew Bible: 2-3 points

Civics: 2 points

1st class: 5-10 points (Must)

2nd class: 5-10 points (Optional)

In addition, they also have some classes they have to pass in order to finish school- internal subjects (such as P.E., two science subjects the school decides- introduction to science, general education, etc.)

Italy
High school in Italy lasts five years.

Malaysia
In Malaysia, 10th grade is also known as Form 4 in secondary school. The students at this stage are 16 years old, and it is their fourth year in secondary school. This is the year when the students are divided into the Science or Arts Stream (determined from their Form 3 Assessment [Pentaksiran Tingkatan 3] Results)

Mexico
In Mexico, the tenth grade is the beginning of the high school, which lasts only three years. Similar to Israel's education system. Tenth graders are normally aged 15–16.

Nepal
In Nepal grade 10 is the final year of Junior High and are generally aged 15 or 16. Students sit a SEE examination in grade 10, after which they qualify for +2(senior high).

Netherlands
In The Netherlands, the 10th grade (based on the level of compulsory secondary education) is the last (VMBO), second to last (HAVO), or fourth out of six (VWO) grades of high school. In all cases it is referred to as vierde klas or just de vierde (the fourth), because when you have finished elementary school, the grade numbers start over, beginning with one and going to either 4 (VMBO), 5 (HAVO) or 6 (VWO).

New Zealand
In New Zealand, Year 11 is the equivalent of tenth grade, with students aged 15 or 16 during the years. It is the third year of secondary school and the eleventh year of compulsory education. Year 11 is also the first year of the National Certificate of Educational Achievement (NCEA), the main national qualification for secondary school students in New Zealand. Students in Year 11 study English (or Te Reo Māori), mathematics, and a minimum of four elective subjects with a science subject highly recommended.

Norway
In Norway, the tenth grade is the last year of compulsory education and the final year of Ungdomsskole, equivalent to junior high school. The students enter the tenth grade the year they turn fifteen.

Pakistan
Grade ten is the final year of high school in Pakistan; it is an important year level as it here that matriculation examinations occur after which students can qualify for grades eleven and twelve in college. Successful completion of college allows eligibility for entrance into universities and higher education. Exams of class 10th usually held in March by examination boards called Boards of Intermediate and Secondary Education. This is called primary schooling in Pakistan.

Philippines
In the Philippines, Grade 10 or Senior Year, is the last year of Junior High School and the fourth year of High School curriculum. Students enrolled in Grade 10 are usually 15–16 years old. This is where they prepare to enter Senior High School.

It was formerly named as 4th Year or Year IV until it changed to Grade 10 on June 1, 2015 upon the start of school year 2015-2016 due to the implementation of the K-12 curriculum. It was also the last year of the High School stage, as well as basic compulsory education in the country.

There is also the Citizen Army Training, a basic military education and training program similar to the Reserve Officers' Training Corps for college students. As in conscription and ROTC, the program is not mandatory.

Russia
In Russia, in the end of ninth grade students have a choice: to progress to the tenth grade in school or go to college. The tenth grade is the beginning of the high school, and it is a pre-exam year, when training to USE is being. Learning is similar with Ninth grade, but priority is given to repeat the material learned in high school (Fifth to Ninth years).

Singapore
In Singapore, 10th grade is equivalent of Secondary 4 level. Students are usually 16 years old and will take either the GCE 'N' Levels or the GCE 'O' Levels at the end of the year.

South Africa
In South Africa, Grade 9 marks the end of a student's General Education and Training-phase. Children in South Africa are required to attend school up to the age of fifteen, or completion of the General Education and Training-phase, whichever comes first. Students have the option of continuing secondary school up to twelfth grade, under Further Education and Training. If they elect to do this, in Grade 10 they have to choose 7 subjects including: 2 languages (one at Home Language level and one at Additional language level), Mathematics or Mathematical Literacy, Life Orientation (which is compulsory) and 3 more elective subjects which differ according to the school the student is enrolled at. Upon successful completion of the twelfth grade, students are granted the National Senior Certificate.

Spain
In Spain, the tenth grade is 4th of E.S.O. (Obligatory Secondary Education, in Spanish "Educación Secundaria Obligatoria").

Sweden

In Sweden, the tenth to twelfth grades are taken at a certain type of school called a 'Gymnasium'. After ninth grade, Swedish children end their compulsory schooling.  Therefore, these schools are significantly divided in terms of both abilities and career aims.  There are two overall types of programs (courses of study) that students can choose from at their schools. Each one is taught in its own separate place. Job-oriented programs (yrkesförberedande program) and programs that prepare for university college (högskoleförberedande program). There are then several programmes of the two types; for example the natural science program (naturvetenskapsprogrammet), which prepares for university college and focuses on subjects like physics, chemistry, biology and math or the construction programme (bygg och anläggningsprogrammet), which is a programme specialized for jobs in that sector. Other options among college preparatory program are for instance the social science program, specializing in social studies and subjects like civics, sociology, psychology, language and history.

For these higher schools students can pick a school that is specialized for the job they wish to take (yrkesförberedande gymnasium). At these schools only classes relevant to the classification of the school are taught, along with language, math and some civics skills. There are widely oriented schools such as General Arts, but also very specific schools, such as Equestrian.

Students that do not yet have any specific career aspirations, or wish to go to a school specialized for a profession that requires a gymnasial degree, can choose to move into a general school, which has programmes preparing for college university (högskoleförberedande program). The system there is very similar to the system from seventh grade to ninth grade except that the student has chosen a program which allows the student to focus on an (albeit in a somewhat general way) area of interest. For instance; the economics programme (ekonomiprogrammet) includes courses in business economics, entrepreneurship and other such courses along with general courses that all students going to schools which prepare for university college must take, such as math, language, civics, physical education etc.

United Kingdom

England and Wales
For education in England and Wales, this is known as Year 11.
General education certificates will be awarded if the pupils sit the end of year examinations, called GCSEs. In Year 11, students take their GCSEs. With grades ranging from 9 to 1, and the grade below 1 being U, these exams show proficiency in a range of subjects. Results of at least five 5 grades are considered a pass and many employers require their staff to have at least 5s in GCSE, including English and Maths. GCSEs are taken in May and June. Pupils may then go on to sit 'A' Levels. A new English Baccalaureate has been introduced; this is awarded to students who achieve a 9 to 5 in five subjects: English (literature and language), maths, science (either combined science (2 GCSEs) or three from physics, chemistry, biology and computer science), a humanities subject (history or geography) and a modern or ancient language.

Scotland
In Scotland, tenth grade (the tenth year after entry into compulsory schooling) is called S4 (or fourth year). At the end of S4, students normally sit for examinations in seven or eight National 5 subjects in which they have studied over the previous two years. National 5s and are taken during the months of May and June. 
It is followed by an optional fifth year (S5) at school or pupils may choose to leave at the end of S4, provided they have reached the age of 16 by 30, September of that year. Those who wish to leave, but will not meet the September deadline, may do so provided that they have either secured an apprenticeship or a placement in a college designed for Christmas Leavers.  They are called this because there are two leaving dates in the academic year - the last day in May (summer leaving date), and the last day before the Christmas holidays (winter leaving date).  Hence the term "Christmas leavers".

United States
The tenth grade is typically the second year of high school, called sophomore year.

In the U.S. curriculum for math, tenth graders are usually taught geometry. Occasionally, trigonometry, precalculus, or higher classes, are offered for students who wish to take Advanced Placement math classes in later years of high school.

In the U.S. curriculum for literature, students have already begun to familiarize themselves with notable authors such as Shakespeare, while advanced programs put a major emphasis on literary terms and themes. Generally, students at this grade will be taught world literature. Like other classes, Honors and Advanced Placement versions of this course are available.

In the U.S. curriculum for science, tenth graders are usually taught chemistry, biology, or physics. Like other classes, Advanced Placement Chemistry and/or Biology is available.

In the U.S. curriculum for social studies, tenth grade students are taught recent world history or American history. In some districts, Advanced Placement coursework, such as geography, European history, Global studies, or United States History.

See also
 Educational stage
 Ninth grade
 Eleventh grade
 Twelfth grade
 Year Ten
 Senior secondary education

References

10
Secondary education

it:Sophomore